Cuțov is a Romanian surname. Notable people with the surname include:

Simion Cuțov (1952–1993), Romanian boxer
Calistrat Cuțov (born 1948), Romanian boxer, brother of Simion

Romanian-language surnames